John Thomas Pickett (February 20, 1866 - July 4, 1922), was a professional baseball player who played infielder in the Major Leagues from -. He would play for the Baltimore Orioles, Philadelphia Athletics, and Kansas City Cowboys.

External links

1866 births
1922 deaths
Major League Baseball infielders
Baltimore Orioles (NL) players
Philadelphia Athletics (PL) players
Kansas City Cowboys players
19th-century baseball players
Minor league baseball managers
Stillwater (minor league baseball) players
Milwaukee Brewers (minor league) players
St. Paul Saints (Northwestern League) players
St. Paul Apostles players
Kansas City Blues (baseball) players
Troy Trojans (minor league) players
Troy Washerwomen players
Scranton Indians players
Minneapolis Millers (baseball) players
St. Paul Saints (Western League) players